The New World warblers or wood-warblers are a group of small, often colorful, passerine birds that make up the family Parulidae and are restricted to the New World. They are not closely related to Old World warblers or Australian warblers. Most are arboreal, but some, like the ovenbird and the two waterthrushes, are primarily terrestrial. Most members of this family are insectivores.

This group likely originated in northern Central America, where the greatest number of species and diversity between them is found. From there, they spread north during the interglacial periods, mainly as migrants, returning to the ancestral region in winter. Two genera, Myioborus and Basileuterus, seem to have colonized South America early, perhaps before the two continents were linked, and together constitute most warbler species of that region.

The scientific name for the family, Parulidae, originates from the fact that Linnaeus in 1758 named the northern parula as a tit, Parus americanus, and as taxonomy developed, the genus name was modified first to Parulus and then to Parula. The family name derives from the name for the genus.

Taxonomy

The family Parulidae was introduced for the New World warblers in 1947 by  American ornithologist Alexander Wetmore and colleagues with Parula as the type genus.

The family was formerly thought to be sister to a clade containing the yellow-breasted chat in its own family Icteriidae, the wrenthrush in its own family Zeledoniidae, the two Cuban warblers in the family Teretistridae and the 109 species in the family Icteridae. However, more recent studies recover them as sister to a clade containing just the yellow-breasted chat and the Icteridae, with the clade containing all three families being sister to a clade containing the chat-tanagers in Calyptophilidae, the wrenthrush, and the Phaenicophilidae.

A molecular phylogenetic study of the Parulidae published in 2010 found that the species formed several major clades that did not align with the traditional genera. This led to a major reorganization of the species within the family to create monotypic genera. The changes have generally followed the recommendations of the authors of the study except in a few cases where the proposed genera were split to separate basal species from their proposed conspecifics.

A large clade that included the 29 species then placed in the genus Dendroica, also included four species of Parula, one of the three species of Wilsonia and the monotypic genera Catharopeza and Setophaga. All members of the clade apart from the basal Catharopeza were placed in the expanded genus Setophaga Swainson, 1827, which under the rules of the International Code of Zoological Nomenclature, had priority over Dendroica Gray, 1842, Wilsonia Bonaparte, 1838, and Parula Bonaparte, 1838.

The species that had traditionally been placed in Basileuterus formed two clades. One group retains the genus name as it includes the golden-crowned warbler, the type species for the genus. The other larger group, now with 18 species, is placed in the resurrected genus Myiothlypis Cabanis, 1850, as it contains the type species, the black-crested warbler.

The genus Myioborus containing the whitestarts remained unchanged after the reorganization but six genera were no longer used: Dendroica, Ergaticus, Euthlypis, Parula, Wilsonia and Phaeothlypis.

Extant Genera
The family Parulidae now contains 117 species divided into 18 genera.

Former species
Some species that were previously placed in the Parulidae have been moved to other families:

 Olive warbler (Peucedramus taeniatus) – now in own family Peucedramidae
 Yellow-breasted chat (Icteria virens) – now in own family Icteriidae
 Three species in the genus Granatellus – now in the family Cardinalidae
 Red-breasted chat (Granatellus venustus)
 Grey-throated chat (Granatellus sallaei)
 Rose-breasted chat (Granatellus pelzelni)
 Wrenthrush (Zeledonia coronata) – now in own family Zeledoniidae
 Two species endemic to Hispaniola – now in family Phaenicophilidae
 Green-tailed warbler (Microligea palustris)
 White-winged warbler (Xenoligea montana) 
 Two species endemic to Cuba in the genus Teretistris – now in own family Teretistridae
Yellow-headed warbler (Teretistris fernandinae)
Oriente warbler (Teretistris fornsi)

Description
All the warblers are fairly small. The Parkesia waterthrushes, the ovenbird, the russet-crowned warbler, and Semper's warbler, all of which can exceed  and 21 g (0.74 oz), may be considered the largest.

The migratory species tend to lay larger clutches of eggs, typically up to six, since the hazards of their journeys mean that many individuals will have only one chance to breed. In contrast, the laying of two eggs is typical for many tropical species, since the chicks can be provided with better care, and the adults are likely to have further opportunities for reproduction.

Many migratory species, particularly those which breed further north, have distinctive male plumage at least in the breeding season, since males need to reclaim territory and advertise for mates each year. This tendency is particularly marked in the large genus Setophaga (formerly Dendroica). In contrast, resident tropical species, which pair for life, show little if any sexual dimorphism, but exceptions occur. The Parkesia waterthrushes and ovenbird are strongly migratory, but have identical male and female plumage, whereas the mainly tropical and sedentary yellowthroats are dimorphic. The Granatellus chats also show sexual dimorphism, but due to recent genetic work, have been moved into the family Cardinalidae (New World buntings and cardinals).

References

Further reading
 Curson, Quinn and Beadle, 1994. New World Warblers. 252 p. 
 
 Harrison, Hal H. 1984. Wood Warblers’ World. New York : Simon and Schuster, 335 p., 24 p. of plates : ill. (some col.) ; 25 cm.
 Lovette, I. J. and E. Bermingham. 2002. What is a wood-warbler? Molecular characterization of a monophyletic Parulidae. The Auk. 119(3): 695–714. PDF fulltext
 Morse, Douglass H. 1989. American Warblers : an Ecological and Behavioral Perspective. Cambridge, Massachusetts : Harvard University Press, xii, 406 p. : ill., maps.

External links 

 New World warblers (Parulidae) information, including 81 species with videos and 100 with photographs at the Internet Bird Collection
 "Chasing Down Warblers" National Geographic News story on seeing 30 warbler species in May 2002